Assyrian script may refer to:

 Cuneiform#Assyrian cuneiform, a writing system used during the Babylonian and Assyrian empires
 Ashuri alphabet (sometimes called the Assyrian alphabet), an old traditional calligraphic form of the Hebrew alphabet, pre dating Hebrew 
 the eastern version of the Syriac alphabet cuneiform writing

See also
 Assyrian (disambiguation)